Mala Rečica is a village in the municipality of Tetovo, North Macedonia.

Demographics
According to the 2021 census, the village had a total of 2.468 inhabitants. Ethnic groups in the village include:

Albanians 2.337
Macedonians 1
Others 130

References

External links

Villages in Tetovo Municipality
Albanian communities in North Macedonia